= Ratip Kazancıgil =

Turkish medical doctor, history researcher

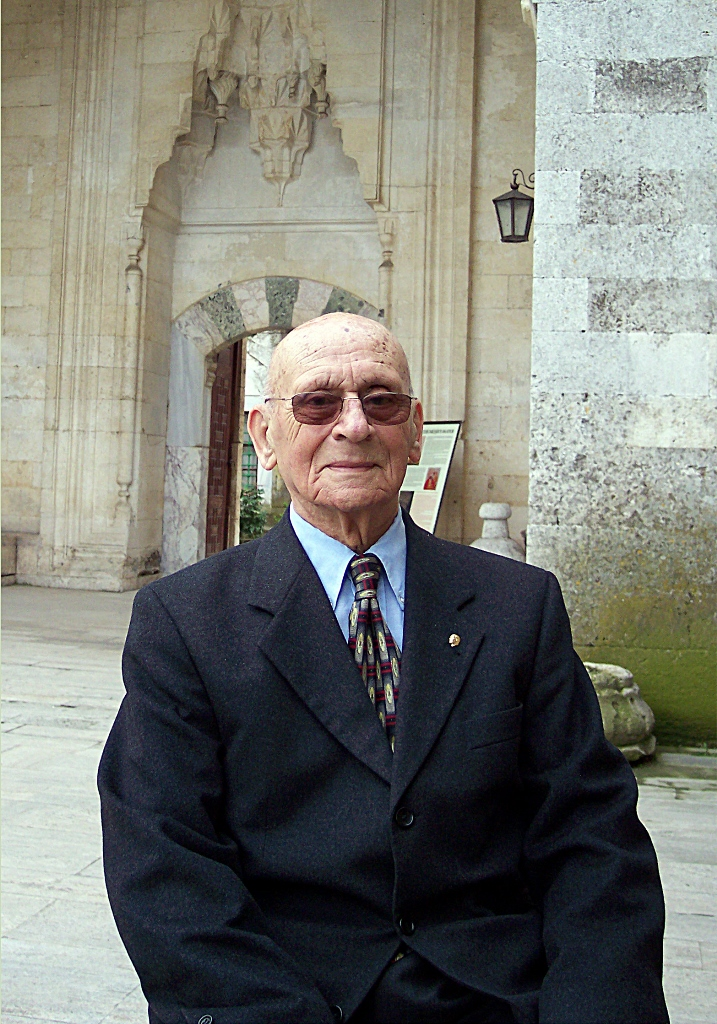
- Kazancıgil in 2003
- Born: 1920; Malatya, Ottoman Empire
- Died: 12 August 2017 (aged 96–97); Edirne, Turkey
- Education: Istanbul University School of Medicine
- Scientific career
- Fields: Medicine, medical history

Ratip Kazancıgil (1920 – 12 August 2017) was a Turkish medical doctor, history researcher and academic. He was born in Malatya in 1920.

In addition to his work in public health in Edirne, he also served as the mayor of Edirne in 1955. Süheyl Ünever became known as "Edirne Lover" after Rifat Osman and Hafız Rakım Ertür.

== Life ==
He completed his primary, secondary and high school education in Malatya. He entered Istanbul University Faculty of Medicine in 1937 and graduated in 1943.

After his military service, he was appointed as the Central Malaria Control Physician of Aydın province in 1946, as the Laboratory Chief of Aydın Malaria Control Directorate in 1948, and as the Thrace Malaria Control Regional Directorate, headquartered in Edirne, in 1950. During these assignments, he traveled to the villages in Trakya and Aydın to drain the swamps and fight against mosquitoes.

Sent to Italy twice between 1950 and 1960 by the Ministry of Health and with a scholarship from the World Health Organization, Kazancıgil attended a one-month course at the “Institute Superiora Di Sanità” Malaria Institute in Rome. In 1958, he was appointed as the Head of the Malaria Eradication Regions Group, and in 1963, he was appointed as the Director of Health and Social Welfare in Edirne, with the condition that he would remain in charge of the Malaria War Department. In the same year, with the scholarship of the World Health Organization, he went to France to attend a course on village public health at the Suvason Regional Public Center and then, with the contributions of UNICEF, he went to Sweden, France, Morocco, Romania and Greece for three months to study the health systems of these countries.

During his tenure as Edirne Health Director, he founded the Association for Assistance to Health Institutions. Through this association, he cooperated with the public to build health centers and health houses in every village of Edirne, and ensured the establishment of medicine cabinets in the villages so that the villagers could access medicine easily. In addition to his work in the field of health, Kazancıgil worked in the field of education; he played a role in the initiation of studies on the establishment of a university in Edirne. In 1975, he was appointed as the president of the Association for the Establishment and Sustenance of Engineering and Architecture in Edirne.

== Awards ==
Turkish Medical Association Nusret Fişek Public Health Award, 1991.

== Works ==
- Edirne Mahalleleri Tarihçesi (1529–1990), Türk Kütüphaneciler Derneği Edirne Şubesi, Yayınları; 1990.
- Edirne İmaretleri, Kütüphaneciler Derneği Edirne Şubesi Yayınları; 1991.
- Edirne Helva Sohbetleri ve Kış Eğlenceleri, Türk Kütüphaneciler Derneği Edirne Şubesi Yayınları; 1993.
- Edirne'de Sultan II. Bayezıd Külliyesi, Türk Kütüphaneciler Derneği Edirne Şubesi Yayınları, 1994.
- Edirne Şehir Tarihi Kronolojisi (M:1330-H:1994), Türk Kütüphaneciler Derneği Edirne Şubesi Yayınları; 1995.
- Edirne Sağlık ve Sosyal Yardım Tarihi
- Edirne'de Osmanlı döneminden 2000 yılına kalan Mîmari Eserler,Edirne Valiliği Yayınları; 2000.
